WWBR (100.9 FM) is a radio station broadcasting a country music format. Licensed to Big Rapids, Michigan, it first began broadcasting in 1964 under the WBRN-FM call sign. Rob & Louise are the Morning show hosts.

Previous logos

Sources
Michiguide.com - WWBR History

External links

WBR
Country radio stations in the United States
Radio stations established in 1964